Calosoma burtoni is a species of ground beetle in the subfamily of Carabinae. It was described by Alluaud in 1913.

References

burtoni
Beetles described in 1913